This is a list of notable footballers who have played for Sporting Clube de Portugal. Generally, this means players that have played a significant amount of first-class matches for the club. Other players who have played an important role for the club can be included, but the reason why they have been included should be added in the 'Notes' column.

For a list of all Sporting CP players, major or minor, with a Wikipedia article, see Category:Sporting CP players, and for the current squad see the main Sporting CP article.

Players are listed according to the date of their first team debut. Appearances and goals are for first-team competitive matches only; wartime matches are excluded. Substitute appearances included.

Table

References

Lists of association football players by club in Portugal
 
Players
Association football player non-biographical articles